General elections were held in Swaziland between 16 and 17 May 1972 to elect members of the House of Assembly. The result was a third successive victory for the royalist Imbokodvo National Movement, which won 78% of the vote and 21 of the 24 seats, based on a voter turnout of 74.0%. The Ngwane National Liberatory Congress won three seats, but five days after the election one of its successful candidates was served with a deportation order as an "undesirable alien". Although he subsequently won a High Court ruling against the order, in November the parliament created a tribunal through which his citizenship was revoked. The Appeal Court declared the act unconstitutional, and on 12 April 1973 the parliament passed a motion that "called on the king to devise ways and means of dealing with the crisis". The result was that King Sobhuza II suspended the constitution, dismissed Parliament, banned all political parties and became an absolute monarch.

Results

References

Elections in Eswatini
Election
Swaziland
Election and referendum articles with incomplete results